Fort Kyk-Over-Al was a Dutch fort in the colony of Essequibo, in what is now Guyana. It was constructed in 1616 at the intersection of the Essequibo, Cuyuni and Mazaruni rivers. It once served as the centre for the Dutch administration of the county, but now only ruins are left. The name Kyk-Over-Al derives from the Dutch for "See over all", a reference to the commanding view of the river from the fort.

History
The Dutch faced their first serious attacks in 1665 when Major John Scott was sent by the Governor of Lord Willoughby, to invade the settlements in the Pomeroon. By that time, prosperous sugar plantations were already established in that area. Scott, in alliance with Caribs, seized Nova Zeelandia, and after leaving 50 men to hold it, he proceeded up the Essequibo and occupied Kyk-Over-Al with 20 men.

By 1672, Fort Kyk Over Al was described as a "two-storeyed brick structure approximately 20m x 20m, complete with a powder magazine inside the wall".

The occupation of Kyk-Over-Al by the English did not last long, for the Dutch Commandeur of Berbice, Matthys Bergenaar, was able to march overland with a group of soldiers and recapture it. At the same time, a French expedition arrived in the Pomeroon area to help the Dutch who were their allies. They besieged the English at the fort at Nova Zeelandia and starved the men into surrendering. The prisoners were shortly after massacred by the Arawaks who were allies of the French.

Thus, Essequibo reverted to the Dutch, Abraham Crijnssen, who had earlier captured Suriname from the English, arrived as Commandeur. He concentrated his attention on redeveloping Kyk-Over-Al and the surrounding areas. Pomeroon was not regarded as a priority.

One year later, another group of French privateers again attacked Essequibo. Pomeroon was also attacked the same year by the French and their Carib allies. However, Commander Blake, the Post-holder, and the few soldiers under his command were able to defend the settlement after killing many of the invaders. In December 1712, Pomeroon was attacked again by a combined force of French and Spanish buccaneers, but Blake and his men were able to drive them away.

In 1716, the building became overcrowded and new buildings were constructed nearby. By 1748, the fort was completely abandoned, and the building was scavenged for new constructions.

The site became of interest in 1897 as a part of the Venezuelan crisis of 1895, when the remnants of the fort were claimed to be built by the Spanish. An archaeologist identified the brickwork to be Dutch.

On 20 July 1999, the building was designated a National Monument.

References

1616 establishments in the Dutch Empire
Buildings and structures completed in 1616
Essequibo
Forts in Guyana
History of Guyana
National Monuments in Guyana